People's Princess is a nickname for Diana, Princess of Wales.

People's Princess or Princess of the People may also refer to:

The People's Princess (radio play), BBC Radio 4 2008 radio play
 Princess Mary Adelaide of Cambridge (1833-1897), mother of Queen Mary of Teck
 Kaʻiulani (1875-1899), last heir apparent to the Hawaiian Kingdom
 Kaiulani: The People's Princess, a 2001 novel by Emily Emmerson White in the series The Royal Diaries
 Tuathflaith, an Irish name whose meaning is "Princess of the People"
 Fremu (titled  meaning "people's princess"), the queen consort of King Offa from the epic poem Beowulf

See also
 
 Peoples (disambiguation)
 Princess (disambiguation)